The 1980 Greenlandic Men's Football Championship was the 10th edition of the Greenlandic Men's Football Championship. The final round was held in Qaqortoq. It was won by Nagdlunguaq-48 for the third time in its history.

Final round

Pool 1

Pool 2

Playoffs

Semi-finals

Fifth-place match

Third place match

Final

See also
Football in Greenland
Football Association of Greenland
Greenland national football team
Greenlandic Men's Football Championship

References

Greenlandic Men's Football Championship seasons
Green
Green
Foot